The Love Brand is a 1923 American silent Western film directed by Stuart Paton and written by Raymond L. Schrock and Adrian Johnson. The film stars Roy Stewart, Wilfrid North, Margaret Landis, Arthur Stuart Hull, Sidney De Gray, and Marie Wells. The film was released on August 13, 1923, by Universal Pictures.

Cast    
 Roy Stewart as Don José O'Neil
 Wilfrid North as Peter Collier
 Margaret Landis as Frances Collier
 Arthur Stuart Hull as Charles Mortimer 
 Sidney De Gray as Miguel Salvador
 Marie Wells as Teresa

References

External links
 
 

1923 films
1923 Western (genre) films
Universal Pictures films
Films directed by Stuart Paton
American black-and-white films
Silent American Western (genre) films
1920s English-language films
1920s American films